Kurfürstendamm is an underground station on lines U1 and U9 of the Berlin U-Bahn. It opened on 28 August 1961, when the first section of the U9 between Spichernstraße and Leopoldplatz was inaugurated. As there had originally been no stop on the U1 where it now crossed the U9, the line received an additional station here.

It lies in eastern Charlottenburg at the intersection of Kurfürstendamm and Joachimstaler Straße, south of the Berlin Zoological Garden and its adjoining railway station. At the intersection above the station is the Café Kranzler, successor of the Café des Westens, a famous venue for artists and bohémiens of the pre–World War I era, as well as the Swissôtel Berlin.

The well-known Kurfürstendamm (or Ku'damm) boulevard is the most important upscale shopping district in Berlin. Next to the Kaiser-Wilhelm-Gedächtniskirche (Kaiser Wilhelm Memorial Church) on Breitscheidplatz, which was shattered during the air raids in World War II, a new church was built.

References 

U1 (Berlin U-Bahn) stations
U9 (Berlin U-Bahn) stations
Buildings and structures in Charlottenburg-Wilmersdorf
Railway stations in Germany opened in 1961